Zafer Özgültekin (born 10 March 1975) is a Turkish former professional footballer who played as a goalkeeper. He was part of the Turkey national team that achieved third place at the 2002.

Honours
Turkey
FIFA World Cup third place: 2002

References

External links
 

1975 births
Living people
Turkish footballers
Association football goalkeepers
Turkey international footballers
2002 FIFA World Cup players
MKE Ankaragücü footballers
Kardemir Karabükspor footballers
Eskişehirspor footballers
Kayseri Erciyesspor footballers
Süper Lig players